The Mid-American Conference women's golf championships is the conference championship tournament for women's golf in the Mid-American Conference, a Division I member of the National Collegiate Athletic Association (NCAA).  All ten conference members qualify for the championship meet, which is held in three rounds.  The winner of the championship receives a regional berth to the NCAA Division I Women's Golf Championships.  The tournament began in 1999 and is rotated to different courses each year, with the various conference members acting as host. Through the 2022 championship, Kent State has won all 23 titles, a conference record for consecutive championships in any sport.

History and format
The championship was organized in 1999 after several conference members added women's golf as a varsity sport in the late 1990s. It is played in late April and consists of three rounds of stroke play held over three days with all ten conference members participating. The 2005 championship only had two rounds played instead of the originally scheduled three due to weather. Beginning in 2006, the format was changed to four rounds, with two rounds on the opening day, but was returned to three rounds in 2010. The inaugural championship, held at the Kings Island Golf Course in Mason, Ohio, consisted of seven teams: Bowling Green, Eastern Michigan, Kent State, Northern Illinois, Ohio, Toledo, and Western Michigan. The total increased to eight in 2001 with the addition of Ball State and nine in 2003 with Marshall joining, but returned to eight for 2006 after Marshall left the MAC following the 2005 season. Akron began MAC play in 2009 and Central Michigan joined in 2015.

Since its debut, the championship has been held at nine different golf courses in Ohio, Indiana, and Illinois. After the inaugural championship at Kings Island, the championship moved to Walden Ponds Golf Club, just outside Hamilton, Ohio, where it was played from 2000 through 2006. Since 2006, the championship has been held at a different course each year, with some courses hosting multiple times. Longaberger Golf Club in Nashport, Ohio, has hosted four times: 2007, 2009, 2011, and 2013, while Hawthorns Golf and Country Club in Fishers, Indiana, has hosted three times: 2010, 2012, and 2014. Other hosts include Brickyard Crossing in Indianapolis for 2008, Shaker Run Golf Club in Lebanon, Ohio, for 2015, Purgatory Golf Club in Noblesville, Indiana, in 2016 and 2019, Silver Lake Country Club in Silver Lake, Ohio, in 2017 and 2021, Naperville Country Club in Naperville, Illinois, in 2018, and Stone Oak Country Club near near Holland, Ohio, in Springfield Township.

Champions

By year
The following is a list of conference champions, individual medalists, and sites listed by year.

By school
The following table lists all teams that have been part of the championship, the years they have participated, and the years the respective program has won the team championship.

References

External links

Mid-American Conference Women's Golf Championship